Walker County is the name of several counties in the United States:

 Walker County, Alabama
 Walker County, Georgia
 Walker County, Texas